Kenny Allstar (born 19 April 1993) is a British DJ and radio presenter and grew up in South East London. He is the host of the legendary BBC Radio 1 Rap Show on Saturday nights, as well as a host on BBC Radio 1Xtra on Friday nights He also hosts a Mad About Bars series on Mixtape Madness on YouTube, where he hosts freestyle videos with the next generation of MCs.

Early life
His interest in music arose early in life. With no television in the house, he recalled listening to the radio day and night, trying to play along to 50 Cent on his keyboard.

He was inspired to devote his life to music when his father took him to a carnival when he was nine or ten. At age 13, he started attending a youth club near his school where aspiring MCs could get on the air. Grime was big at that time, and each aspiring MC would pay £2 to rap for eight bars. Soon he decided MCing wasn't for him and began DJing at that local underground online grime station. By his mid-teens, he had bought a cheap set of decks and begun DJing at South London rap cyphers.

DJ career
Before he turned 18, he talked his way into presenting on Deja Vu 92.3 FM. He also presented on London's Radar Radio, toured as Sneakbo's official DJ, and was instrumental in the rise of rapper Abra Cadabra.

His Mad About Bars series on YouTube's Mixtape Madness platform has run for three seasons and over 30 million views. On the series, he has championed rappers such as Skengdo & AM, AJ Tracey, Izzie Gibbs and Kojey Radical.

In November 2017, he was tapped to DJ on BBC Radio 1Xtra, where he appeared in rotation over the next six months. This led to a permanent engagement with BBC Radio 1Xtra, when the platform brought him back in October 2018 to take over the Friday night slot of DJ Semtex, who left after having worked with the station for 15 years. Making the announcement, Mark Strippel, 1XTra's head of programmes, described Kenny as a "core champion for the UK scene."

In 2018, Kenny was at Notting Hill Carnival, playing sets at stages and parties.

Album
Kenny's debut album, Block Diaries, was released 5 October 2018 on Columbia Records. Its 17 tracks bring more than 30 musicians together and cover a variety of styles: UK rap, drill, Afroswing, grime. It features a number of rappers and other artists who came into the studio to produce with Kenny for the project, including 67, Not3s, SNE, Abra Cadabra, Belly Squad, and M Huncho. "Tracksuit Love," the album's first single, a collaboration with Headie One, drew over 2.3 million views on YouTube and 1.5 million spins on Spotify in its first three months.

Kenny's aim for the album, he said, was to be a "culturally significant voice for young people in London, those who are growing up on council estates in less fortunate situations." The album title came from Kenny's memories of growing up amid the tower blocks of the estates where he grew up, and his youthful habit of writing his thoughts and feelings in a diary.

Personal life
Kenny is a football fan and supporter of Chelsea F.C.

References

External links
Kenny Allstar (BBC Radio 1Xtra)

Black British DJs
1993 births
Living people
BBC Radio 1Xtra presenters
Columbia Records artists
Radio presenters from London
UK drill musicians